Vejrhanen is a 1952 Danish family film directed by Lau Lauritzen Jr.

Cast
Johannes Meyer as Theodor Nielsen
Ilselil Larsen as Eva Nielsen
Einar Juhl as Leo Svaneberg
Randi Michelsen as Sigrid Svaneberg
Sigurd Langberg as Købmand Harms
Louis Miehe-Renard as Erik Hansen
Valdemar Skjerning as Pastor Jerild
Jørn Jeppesen as Advokat Ludvigsen
Johannes Marott as Redaktør Svendesen
Karl Stegger as Byrådsformanden
Ejner Federspiel as Rektoren
Helge Kjærulff-Schmidt as Klokker Larsen
Ole Monty as Mand med madpakke
Dirch Passer as Ekspeditionssekretær i Kirkeministeriet
Emil Hass Christensen as Chef i Statsradiofonien
Carl Ottosen as Ansat i Statsradiofonien
Knud Schrøder

External links

1952 films
1950s Danish-language films
Danish black-and-white films
Films directed by Lau Lauritzen Jr.
Films scored by Sven Gyldmark
ASA Filmudlejning films